Torbjørn Færøvik (born 8 June 1948) is a Norwegian historian, journalist and non-fiction writer.

He is a three-time recipient of the Brage Prize, and also the last recipient of the Cappelen Prize.

References

1948 births
Living people
Norwegian journalists
20th-century Norwegian historians
Norwegian non-fiction writers
NRK people
21st-century Norwegian historians